Mörike-Preis der Stadt Fellbach is a literature prize awarded in Baden-Württemberg, Germany. Since 1991, the City of Fellbach has awarded the prize in memory of the poet Eduard Mörike, who lived in Fellbach for some time in 1873. The prize money is €15,000.

Winners
FP – Förderpreis

 1991 Wolf Biermann, FP: Utz Rachowski
 1994 Sigrid Damm, FP: Róža Domašcyna
 1997 W. G. Sebald, FP: Wolfgang Schlüter
 2000 Robert Schindel, FP: Doron Rabinovici
 2003 Brigitte Kronauer, FP: Elisabeth Binder
 2006 Michael Krüger, FP: Andrzej Kopacki
 2009 Ernst Augustin, FP: Sandra Hoffmann
 2012 Jan Peter Bremer, FP: Konstantin Ames
 2015 Jan Wagner, FP: 
 2018 Elke Erb, FP: 
 2021 , FP:

References

External links
 

Literary awards of Baden-Württemberg